Lulyana Thalía Olvino Torres (born 19 May 1999) is a Venezuelan actress, model and beauty pageant titleholder who was crowned Miss Venezuela 2019. She represented the state of Delta Amacuro at the pageant and represented Venezuela at the Miss Universe 2019 competition where she placed as Top 20.

Life and career

Early life and education
Olvino was born in Valencia, Carabobo. She is a Graduate in Management and Administrative Sciences with a mention in Marketing obtained at Universidad Tecnológica del Centro in Valencia.

She participated in the Reinado del Festival de Nuestra Señora del Socorro in his city, winning it, and thus initiating achievements in the world of modeling. Likewise, she participated in the Miss Earth Carabobo contest where she was a finalist. Also she has excelled in synchronized swimming, winning medals in national and international youth competitions. while she also likes to meditate and teach methodology classes as a hobby. She manages his native Spanish language and English.

In 2019, she entered Miss Venezuela, where she was assigned the Delta Amacuro state band.

Pageantry

Miss Venezuela 2019 
At the end of Miss Venezuela 2019 held on August 1, 2019, Olvino was crowned Miss Venezuela 2019. She represented Venezuela in Miss Universe 2019. Olvino succeeded Miss Venezuela 2018 Isabella Rodríguez and was crowned by her at the final event. Her court included Miss Venezuela International 2019, Melissa Jiménez from Zulia. Since her crowning, Olvino has attended many events with her fellow Miss Venezuela and Mister Venezuela titleholders. She has advocated and has taken her social project into the empower of women and girls seeking to highlight the beauty that moves away from measures and stereotypes.

Miss Universe 2019 
In December 2019, she represented Venezuela at the Miss Universe 2019 pageant hosted in Atlanta, Georgia. For her national costume, she chose to represent a futuristic design with a kinetic profile of the plastic artist Carlos Cruz-Diez. At the 2019 Miss Universe pageant, Olvino placed as Top 20. This is the third consecutive placement for Venezuela since Keysi Sayago in 2017.

References

External links
 

1999 births
Living people
Venezuelan female models
Miss Universe 2019 contestants
Miss Venezuela winners
People from Carabobo